Falling Man is an oil on canvas painting by the German artist Max Beckmann. The work was created in New York City during the final year of his life when he was living in the United States, since he had left the Netherlands in 1947. The painting is in the National Gallery of Art in Washington D.C.

The work is considered eerily predictive of the jumpers and other doomed people falling from the World Trade Center Towers on September 11, 2001 in New York, on a similar setting to the painting, clear blue day.

Falling Man is said to be preceded in Beckmann's opus by some of the drawings he did for his 1943–44 illustration of Goethe's Faust II which contains multiple images of falling men.

The painting was included in the 2016–17 exhibition of the artist's work Max Beckmann in New York at the Metropolitan Museum of Art.

References

1950 paintings
Paintings by Max Beckmann
Collections of the National Gallery of Art